Terrace Mountain is a mountain located in the Catskill Mountains of New York south-southwest of Phoenicia. Wittenberg Mountain is located southwest, Fork Ridge is located west-northwest, and Cross Mountain is located east of Terrace Mountain.

References

Mountains of Ulster County, New York
Mountains of New York (state)